Gorenje Kamence is a settlement north of the town of Novo Mesto in southeastern Slovenia. The entire City Municipality of Novo Mesto is part of the traditional region of Lower Carniola and is now included in the Southeast Slovenia Statistical Region.

The local church is dedicated to the Holy Cross and belongs to the Parish of Novo Mesto–Sveti Janez. It is a medieval building that was restyled in the Baroque in the 17th and 18th centuries.

References

External links
Gorenje Kamence on Geopedia

Populated places in the City Municipality of Novo Mesto